is a railway station on the Hakodate Main Line in Niseko, Hokkaidō, Japan. It is operated by JR Hokkaido and has the station number "S25".

Lines
Both local and the Rapid Niseko Liner services stop at the station.

Station layout
The station consists of two opposed side platforms serving two tracks at grade. Niseko Station is a simple consignment station, administered by Kutchan Station, and operated by Niseko association of sightseeing. Ordinary tickets, express tickets, and reserved-seat tickets for all JR lines are on sale.(Kan'i itaku station)

Platforms

History
After the Hokkaido Railway was nationalized on 1 July 1907, Japanese Government Railways (JGR) took over control of the station. On 12 October 1909 the station became part of the Hakodate Main Line. On 1 April 1968, Japanese National Railways (JNR), the successor of JGR, renamed the station to Niseko. With the privatization of JNR on 1 April 1987, control of the station passed to JR Hokkaido.

Surrounding area
 Niseko town office
 Niseko-Ekimae Post office
 Niseko Post office

See also
 List of railway stations in Japan

References

Railway stations in Japan opened in 1904
Niseko Station